José-Itamar de Freitas (Miracema, August 4, 1934 - Rio de Janeiro, July 1, 2020) was a Brazilian journalist.

Career

Freitas started at Fatos & Fotos, from Bloch Editores, where he won the Esso Prize in 1965. In 1973, already at Rede Globo, he started directing the Fantástico program, in which he stayed until 1991. Freitas also collaborated for Jornal Nacional.

Death

He died at the age of 85, on July 1, 2020, due to complications from COVID-19.

References

1934 births
2020 deaths
Brazilian journalists
Male journalists
Brazilian television directors
Deaths from the COVID-19 pandemic in Rio de Janeiro (state)